Daniel Patrick McCarthy (born April 7, 1958 in St. Marys, Ontario) is a former professional ice hockey player.

McCarthy is the founder and president of the Do It Right Foundation and is the general manager of the Connecticut Wolves Junior hockey team. He stepped down as head coach early in 2000-01 after leading the team to two MJHL semifinal appearances in the team's first two years of operation. McCarthy returned to the bench during 2007-08 season as head coach of the Hartford Jr. Wolfpack of the AJHL. McCarthy is currently the head coach of the Jr. Wolfpack of the MJHL.

Career statistics

Regular season
                                            --- Regular season ---  ---- Playoffs ----
Season   Team                        Lge    GP    G    A  Pts  PIM  GP   G   A Pts PIM
--------------------------------------------------------------------------------------

1974-75  Stratford Cullitons         JrB    36   23   37   60   73
1975-76  Sudbury Wolves              OHA    65   17   30   47   23
1976-77  Sudbury Wolves              OHA    54   23   32   55   76
1977-78  Toledo Goaldiggers          IHL     9    2    4    6    9  --  --  --  --  --
1977-78  Sudbury Wolves              OHA    68   30   51   81   96
1978-79  Flint Generals              IHL    75   38   42   80   80   9   5   2   7  13
1979-80  New Haven Nighthawks        AHL    26    6    3    9    8  --  --  --  --  --
1979-80  Richmond Rifles             EHL     8    6    4   10    7   5   3   1   4  22
1980-81  New Haven Nighthawks        AHL    71   28   17   45   54   4   0   0   0   4
1980-81  New York Rangers            NHL     5    4    0    4    4  --  --  --  --  --
1981-82  Springfield Indians         AHL    78   26   32   58   57  --  --  --  --  --
1982-83  Birmingham South Stars      CHL    76   30   35   65   67  13   4   5   9  15
1983-84  Baltimore Skipjacks         AHL    27    8   11   19    8  --  --  --  --  --
1984-85  Baltimore Skipjacks         AHL    32    3   11   14   19  15   3   4   7  18
1985-86  New Haven Nighthawks        AHL    33    7    9   16   46  --  --  --  --  --
--------------------------------------------------------------------------------------
         NHL totals                          5    4    0    4    4

External links

Connecticut Wolves Hockey
Stratford Cullitons Alumni
Sudbury Wolves Alumni
Legends of Hockey Player Search
New York Rangers All Time Roster

1958 births
Baltimore Skipjacks players
Birmingham South Stars players
Flint Generals players
Ice hockey people from Ontario
Living people
New York Rangers draft picks
New York Rangers players
People from Perth County, Ontario
Springfield Indians players
Sudbury Wolves players
Canadian ice hockey centres